The Polyot (flight) (Also known as Sputnik, GRAU index 11A59) was an interim orbital carrier rocket, built to test ASAT spacecraft. It was required as a stopgap after the cancellation of the UR-200 programme, but before the Tsyklon could enter service. Only two were ever launched, the first on 1 November 1963, and the last on 12 April 1964. Both of these flights were successful.

The rocket consisted of a core stage, and four boosters, which were taken from a Voskhod 11A57 rocket. It was capable of delivering a 1,400 kg payload into a 300 km by 59° Low Earth orbit.

It is a member of the R-7 family.

See also

Comparable rockets
Tsyklon
UR-200

Related developments
R-7 Semyorka
Vostok rocket
Voskhod rocket
Molniya rocket
Soyuz rocket

Associated spacecraft
ASAT

External links
 Encyclopedia Astronautica entry

Space launch vehicles of the Soviet Union
R-7 (rocket family)
Vehicles introduced in 1963